Zehra Çırak (Istanbul, 1960) is a Turkish-German writer. 

She moved to Germany with her family when she was three years old and she has lived in Berlin since 1982. She started publishing in the magazine Flugfänger.

Works
Flugfänger, Gedichte, Edition artinform, 1988
Vogel auf dem Rücken eines Elefanten, Gedichte, Kiepenheuer & Witsch, Köln 1991
Fremde Flügel auf eigener Schulter, Gedichte, Kiepenheuer & Witsch, Köln 1994
Leibesübungen, Gedichte, Verlag Kiepenheuer & Witsch, Köln 2000
In Bewegung, Gedichte und Prosaminiaturen  Verlag Hans Schiler, Berlin 2008
Der Geruch von Glück, Erzählungen, Verlag Hans Schiler, Berlin 2011

Awards
Friedrich-Hölderlin-Förderpreis, 1993
Adelbert von Chamisso Prize, 2001

External links
 

1960 births
Living people
Turkish writers in German 
German people of Turkish descent
German women writers
Turkish women writers